Vera Zvonareva defeated the defending champion Ana Ivanovic in the final, 7–6(7–5), 6–2 to win the women's singles tennis title at the 2009 Indian Wells Masters. The match was a rematch of the previous year's quarterfinal.

Seeds
All seeds received a bye into the second round.

Draw

Finals

Top half

Section 1

Section 2

Section 3

Section 4

Bottom half

Section 5

Section 6

Section 7

Section 8

References

External links
Main Draw
Qualifying Draw

Bnp Paribas Open - Women's Singles, 2009
2009 BNP Paribas Open